This is a list of some ghost towns in the U.S. State of Colorado. Colorado has over 1,500 ghost towns, although visible remains of only about 640 still exist. Due to incomplete records and legends that are now accepted as fact, no exhaustive list can realistically be produced.


Colorado ghost towns
Most Colorado ghost towns were abandoned for the following reasons:

Mining towns were abandoned when the mines closed; many due to the devaluation of silver in 1893.
Mill towns were abandoned when the mining towns they serviced closed.
Farming towns on the eastern plains were often deserted due to rural depopulation.
Coal towns were abandoned when the coal (or the need for it) ran out.
Stage stops were abandoned when the railroad came through.
Rail stops were deserted when the railroad changed routes or abandoned the spurs. 

Others were abandoned for more unusual reasons.  Some were resort towns which never brought in enough tourists.  One or two former townsites are now underwater, caused by the creation of reservoirs; a few are covered in mining tailings, as noted below. Of the list below, some involve settlements with visible tangible remains such as structures or cemeteries, while the precise location of others is known only through maps and historic accounts.

Table of Colorado ghost towns
The following is a sortable table of some of the most notable Colorado ghost towns.

Notes

Gallery

See also

Colorado
Bibliography of Colorado
Index of Colorado-related articles
Outline of Colorado
Colorado statistical areas
Geography of Colorado
History of Colorado
List of counties in Colorado
List of places in Colorado
List of mountain passes in Colorado
List of mountain peaks of Colorado
List of mountain ranges of Colorado
List of populated places in Colorado
List of census-designated places in Colorado
List of county seats in Colorado
List of forts in Colorado
List of ghost towns in Colorado
List of historic places in Colorado
List of municipalities in Colorado
List of post offices in Colorado
List of rivers of Colorado
List of protected areas of Colorado

References

External links

Colorado state government website
Colorado tourism website
History Colorado website
Full Resolution Ghost Town and Historic Photos by Coloradopast.com
Colorado Ghost Town Photos by Rocky Mountain Profiles

 
Colorado geography-related lists
Colorado history-related lists
Lists of places in Colorado
Colorado, List of ghost towns in
Colorado, List of ghost towns in